California station may refer to:

 California station (CTA Congress Line)
 California station (CTA Blue Line)
 California station (CTA Green Line)
 California station (CTA Pink Line)
 California Area Public Library, a former railway station in California, Pennsylvania, which is now a public library